Energies for Italy (EpI) was a political party in Italy, launched in November 2016 and officially established on 1 April 2017. Its leader is Stefano Parisi, a former director-general of Confindustria and CEO of Fastweb, who was an unsuccessful candidate for mayor in the 2016 Milan municipal election.

History
In the run-up of the 2016 Milan municipal election, Stefano Parisi was selected by Silvio Berlusconi as the candidate for mayor for Forza Italia (FI). In the election, Parisi pulled the party to 20.2%, but however narrowly lost to his Democratic opponent, Giuseppe Sala, in the run-off. After asking Parisi to reform the party, in November Berlusconi disowned him, due to his difficult political relationship with the party's major ally, Lega Nord (LN). Parisi thus launched his own party, EpI, and soon came to terms again with LN, aiming at being part of the same centre-right coalition.

In March 2017 Maurizio Sacconi, senator and former minister, who had been a member of the Italian Socialist Party (like Parisi), the old Forza Italia (FI) and the New Centre-Right (NCD), joined EpI, after stepping down from NCD Senate leader in February 2015 and later refusing to join the NCD-sponsored Popular Alternative (AP).

Later on, the party was joined by another senator (Gabriele Albertini) and five deputies (Domenico Menorello, Giovanni Monchiero, Dino Secco, Gugliemo Vaccaro and Gianluigi Gigli), mostly splinters of FI, NCD/AP and Civic Choice (SC). In September 2017 EpI joined forces with "The Marianne", a liberal political association led by Giovanni Negri (a former secretary of the Radical Party). In November 2017, the Civics and Innovators sub-group in the Chamber, led by Monchiero, was renamed "Civics and Innovators – Energies for Italy".

On 13 January 2018, EpI and CI launched a joint list named "Energies for Italy – for the Centre-right", allied with Silvio Berlusconi's Forza Italia.

On 17 December 2020 Parisi declared his farewell to politics to return to being an entrepreneur, recalling the unsuccessful attempt to give the center-right a liberal-popular impulse.

Electoral results

Regional Councils

Leadership
Secretary: Stefano Parisi (2017–2020)

Symbols

References

External links
 Official website

2016 establishments in Italy
2020 disestablishments in Italy
Conservative parties in Italy
Liberal parties in Italy
Political parties established in 2016
Political parties disestablished in 2020